These 111 species belong to Psylla, a genus of plant-parasitic hemipterans in the family Psyllidae.

Psylla species

 Psylla aceris Loginova, 1964 c g
 Psylla aili Yang & Li, 1984 c g
 Psylla alni (Linné, 1758) c g
 Psylla alnicola Li, 1992 c g
 Psylla alnifasciata Li, 2011 c g
 Psylla alniformosanaesuga Lauterer, Yang & Fang, 1988 c g
 Psylla alpina Foerster, 1848 c g
 Psylla ancylocaula Li, 2011 c g
 Psylla aranetae Miyatake, 1972 c g
 Psylla arisana Kuwayama, 1908 c g
 Psylla aurea Li, 2011 c g
 Psylla aureicapita Li, 2011 c g
 Psylla bakeri Crawford, 1919 c g
 Psylla baphicacanthi Yang, 1984 c g
 Psylla betulae (Linné, 1758) c g
 Psylla betulaenanae Ossiannilsson, 1970 c g b  (dwarf birch psyllid)
 Psylla betulibetuliae Li, 2011 c g
 Psylla borealis Horvath, 1908 c g
 Psylla buxi (Linné, 1758) c g b  (boxwood psyllid)
 Psylla capricornis Li, 2005 c g
 Psylla carpinicola Crawford, 1914 c g b
 Psylla caudata Crawford, 1914 c g
 Psylla cedrelae Kieffer, 1905 c g
 Psylla chaenomelei Yang & Li, 1984 c g
 Psylla changli Yang & Li, 1981 c g
 Psylla chujoi Miyatake, 1982 c g
 Psylla colorada Crawford, 1917 c g
 Psylla compta Crawford, 1919 c g
 Psylla cordata Tamanini, 1977 c g
 Psylla cotoneastericola Li, 2005 c g
 Psylla crenata Crawford, 1917 c g
 Psylla cunashiri Konovalova, 1981 c g
 Psylla curticapita Li, 2011 c g
 Psylla deflua Yang, 1984 c g
 Psylla dianli Yang & Li, 1984 c g
 Psylla distincta Pettey, 1933 c g
 Psylla eastopi Mathur, 1975 c g
 Psylla eriobotryacola Yang, 1984 c g
 Psylla eriobotryae Yang, 1984 c g
 Psylla floccosa Patch, 1909 c g b  (cottony alder psyllid)
 Psylla formosana Yang, 1984 c g
 Psylla fumosa Crawford, 1919 c g
 Psylla fusca (Zetterstedt, 1828) c g
 Psylla fuscinodulus Enderlein, 1918 c g
 Psylla grata Yang, 1984 c g
 Psylla hippophae Li, 2011 c g
 Psylla huabeialnia Li, 2011 c g
 Psylla hyalina Mathur, 1975 c g
 Psylla ignescens Li & Yang, 1984 c g
 Psylla ileicis Li, 2011 c g
 Psylla indica (Yang, 1984) c g
 Psylla indicata Yang, 1984 c g
 Psylla infesta Yang, 1984 c g
 Psylla ingae Tuthill, 1959 c g
 Psylla juiliensis Yang, 1984 c g
 Psylla kilimandjaroensis Enderlein, 1910 c g
 Psylla kotejai Drohojowska & Klimaszewski, 2006 c g
 Psylla lanceolata Yang, 1984 c g
 Psylla leprosa Crawford, 1919 c g
 Psylla litchi Giard, 1893 c g
 Psylla liuheica Li, 2011 c g
 Psylla longicauda Konovalova, 1986 c g
 Psylla longigena Mathur, 1975 c g
 Psylla loranthi Capener, 1973 c g
 Psylla magnifera Kuwayama, 1908 c g
 Psylla mala Yang, 1984 c g
 Psylla mecoura Li, 2011 c g
 Psylla minima Konovalova, 1979 c g
 Psylla minutiforma Caldwell, 1944 c g
 Psylla montanica Gegechkori, 1981 c g
 Psylla morimotoi Miyatake, 1963 c g
 Psylla muiri Crawford, 1919 c g
 Psylla multipunctata Miyatake, 1964 c g
 Psylla murrayi Mathur, 1975 c g
 Psylla neolitseae Miyatake, 1981 c g
 Psylla nigella Konovalova, 1979 c g
 Psylla obliqua (Thomson, 1877) c g
 Psylla oblonga Mathur, 1975 c g
 Psylla octomaculata Konovalova, 1980 c g
 Psylla omogoensis Miyatake, 1963 c g
 Psylla opulenta Yang, 1984 c g
 Psylla pamirica Baeva, 1966 c g
 Psylla picciconica Li, 2011 c g
 Psylla plagiosticta Li, 2011 c g
 Psylla praevia Loginova, 1964 c g
 Psylla prima Fang & Yang, 1986 g
 Psylla pulla Yang, 1984 c g
 Psylla quianli Yang & Li, 1984 c g
 Psylla ribicola Loginova, 1964 c g
 Psylla rigida Yang, 1984 c g
 Psylla rubescens Li & Yang, 1984 c g
 Psylla sanguinea (Provancher, 1872) c g b
 Psylla santali Mathur, 1975 c g
 Psylla sarcospermae (Li, 2011) c g
 Psylla sibirica Loginova, 1966 c g
 Psylla simaoli Yang & Li, 1984 c g
 Psylla simlae Crawford, 1912 c g
 Psylla spadica Kuwayama, 1908 c g
 Psylla stranvaesiae Yang, 1984 c g
 Psylla sulcata Mathur, 1973 c g
 Psylla tayulinensis Yang, 1984 c g
 Psylla tetrapanaxae Yang, 1984 c g
 Psylla torrida Crawford, 1914 c g
 Psylla unica Bajeva, 1978 c g
 Psylla viccifoliae Yang & Li, 1984 c g
 Psylla viridescens (Provancher, 1872) c g b
 Psylla vulpis Loginova, 1964 c g
 Psylla winkleri Rübsaamen, 1910 c g
 Psylla yasumatsui Miyatake, 1963 c g
 Psylla yunli Yang & Li, 1984 c g
 Psylla ziozankeana Kuwayama, 1908 c g

Data sources: i = ITIS, c = Catalogue of Life, g = GBIF, b = Bugguide.net

References

Psylla